Events in the year 2023 in the Palestinian territories.

Incumbents

Events 
Ongoing — COVID-19 pandemic in the State of Palestine

 1 January – Two Palestinians are killed and three more injured during confrontations with Israeli soldiers who storm Kafr Dan to demolish the homes of two Palestinians killed in a shootout at a checkpoint in Jenin, West Bank several months ago.
 12 January – A Palestinian man opens fire on Israeli soldiers in Qalandia, West Bank, and is shot dead. In a separate incident, a Palestinian man is killed by Israeli soldiers after stabbing to death an Israeli settler at a farm.
 14 January – Two Palestinian Islamic Jihad members are killed by Israeli soldiers during a raid in Jaba, West Bank.
 26 January – 2023 Jenin killings: At least nine Palestinians are killed and 16 more injured during a raid by Israeli soldiers in Jenin, and the ensuing gunfight with the Palestinian Islamic Jihad.
 27 January – Israeli Air Force jets launch airstrikes on an underground rocket manufacturing site, and a military base used by Hamas in the Gaza Strip, in response to rockets fired by Palestinian militants into southern Israel.
 28 January – Eight people are killed in a mass shooting by a Palestinian at a synagogue in Neve Yaakov, East Jerusalem. 
 29 January – An 18-year-old armed Palestinian man is shot and killed by a group of Israeli civilians near the settlement of Kedumim, West Bank. In a separate incident, a Palestinian civilian home is set on fire by settlers. The occupants were not there at the time of the attack.
 6 February – Five Palestinians are killed and three more injured during a raid by Israeli soldiers and subsequent gunbattle at a refugee camp near Jericho, in the occupied West Bank.
 22 February – 2023 Nablus clash: Israeli troops conducting a counterterrorism operation clash with Palestinians in Nablus, West Bank, killing nine Palestinians and injuring 97 others, according to the Palestinian Health Ministry.
 26 February – 2023 Huwara shooting: A Palestinian gunman shoots and kills two Israelis in Huwara, Nablus Governorate, West Bank. During revenge attacks by Israelis, a Palestinian is shot and killed and 98 others are injured, many of whom during arson attacks.
28 February – An Israeli-American man is killed during a drive-by shooting at a highway in the city of Jericho, in the West Bank.
6 March – Five Palestinians are injured by Israeli settlers attacking a family on a street in Huwara, in the West Bank. Twenty-five Palestinians are injured by tear gas fired by Israeli soldiers during the attack.
7 March – At least six members of the Jenin Brigades are killed by Israeli soldiers during a raid in Jenin, West Bank. Among those killed is the killer of two Israeli settlers last month.
9 March – Three Palestinian fighters are killed by Israeli special units during a shootout in Jenin.
10 March – A Palestinian man is shot dead by an Israeli settler near a farm in Karnei Shomron, in the West Bank. The Israel Defense Forces (IDF) claims that the Palestinian man was armed at the time.
12 March – Israeli soldiers kill three Palestinian gunmen near Nablus, West Bank, after coming under fire.

Deaths 

 5 February – May Sayegh, 82, poet and political activist.

See also 
 Timeline of the Israeli–Palestinian conflict in 2023

References 

 
Palestine
Palestine
2020s in the State of Palestine
Years of the 21st century in the State of Palestine